Shahrak-e Kheybar is a village in Kheybar Rural District, Choghamish District, Dezful County, Khuzestan Province, Iran. At the 2006 census, its population was 2,124, in 421 families.

References 

Populated places in Dezful County